William H. Jordy (1917 – 10 August 1997) was a leading American architectural historian.  At the time of his death, Jordy was Henry Ledyard Goddard Professor Emeritus of Art History at Brown University, where he taught for many years.

Jordy received his Ph.D. at Yale University in 1948.  He joined the Yale faculty that year and remained until 1955, when he joined the Department of Art History at Brown, and began the long teaching career for which he is famous.

His books include two volumes of the five-volume American Buildings and Their Architects series and Buildings of Rhode Island (published posthumously) in the Society of Architectural Historians Buildings of the United States series. He contributed occasionally to the Journal of the Society of Architectural Historians and wrote regularly on architectural subjects for The New Criterion.

Books
 Jordy, William H., American Buildings and Their Architects: Progressive and Academic Ideals at the Turn of the Twentieth Century, Doubleday, Garden City NY 1972
 Jordy, William H., American Buildings and Their Architects: The Impact of European Modernism in the Mid-twentieth Century, Doubleday, Garden City NY 1972
 Jordy, William H., Buildings of Rhode Island (Ronald J. Onorato and William McKenzie Woodward, contributing editors), Oxford University Press, New York 2004, 
 Jordy, William H., and Monkhouse, Christopher P., Buildings on Paper: Rhode Island Architectural Drawings, 1825-1945, Bell Gallery, List Art Center, Brown University, Providence RI 1982
 Jordy, William H., Henry Adams:  Scientific Historian, Yale University Press, New Haven 1952
 Jordy, William H., "Symbolic essence" and Other Writings on Modern Architecture and American Culture (Mardges Bacon, editor, for the Temple Hoyne Buell Center for the Study of American Architecture), Yale University Press, New Haven 2005,

References
 Pierson, William H., Jr., "William Henry Jordy: A Reflection," Journal of the Society of Architectural Historians v. 56, n. 4 (1997), pages 412-413, 538.

1917 births
1997 deaths
American architecture writers
American architectural historians
American art historians
Yale University alumni
Brown University faculty
20th-century American historians
20th-century American male writers
American male non-fiction writers